Fürstenfeld Airport is a private use airport located  north-northeast of Fürstenfeld, Steiermark, Austria.

See also
List of airports in Austria

References

External links 
 Airport record for Fürstenfeld Airport at Landings.com

Airports in Austria
Styria
Fürstenfeld